JAS Motorsport is an Italian motor racing team and an engineering and manufacturing company. It was founded in 1995 by Paolo Jasson, Maurizio Ambrogetti and Giorgio Schon. The company initially competed with Alfa Romeo in 1996 and 1997. Since 1998, they have been an official partner of Honda, and have developed, built and raced cars in various different disciplines for the Japanese manufacturer, as well as provided customer racing services.

History 
JAS Motorsport was founded on 1 September 1995. The team raced four Alfa Romeo 155 V6 TIs in the 1996 International Touring Car Championship, scoring seven podiums and a victory at Silverstone with Gabriele Tarquini. In 1997 they raced two Alfa Romeos in the Super Tourenwagen Cup, with two seventh places being their best results that season.

In 1998, JAS became a partner of Honda. It began competing with Honda Accords in the Super Tourenwagen Cup, and would claim a victory in the 1998 season, before scoring four wins, 17 podiums and third place in the drivers' championship for Tom Kristensen in 1999. The team then competed with Accords in the European Super Touring Cup/Championship in 2000 and 2001, where it scored 15 wins – more than any other team – and finished runner-up in the teams' championship in 2001. JAS also helped running the BTCC Honda team in 2000, which claimed seven victories that year, including the last three wins of the championship's Super Touring era.

In 2004, JAS launched the Honda Accord Euro-R for the Super 2000 regulations. Ryan Sharp scored Honda's first World Touring Car Championship podium with the car in 2006, before James Thompson drove it to take the Japanese manufacturer's first overall WTCC win at the Race of Europe in 2008. The car later won three consecutive European Touring Car Cup titles between 2009 and 2011 with Thompson and Fabrizio Giovanardi.

For R3 rallying regulations, JAS made the Civic Type-R R3, which began competing in 2007. The car won the 2WD manufacturers' title for Honda in the Intercontinental Rally Challenge in 2011, before winning the 2WD title in the European Rally Championship in 2013 and 2014.

In 2012, Honda announced that it would join the World Touring Car Championship, with JAS running the team and developing the chassis. The team raced in the final three rounds of the 2012 season, with Tiago Monteiro scoring a podium in Macau. In their first full season in 2013, the team were crowned Manufacturers' World Champions, with the Civics scoring four victories and 20 podiums, including podium lockouts in Slovakia and China. After the introduction of the new TC1 regulations a year earlier than planned in 2014 gave a significant development advantage to Citroën, the team won multiple races, but didn't contend for the title again until 2017. The team scored the most pole positions and main race victories in 2017, but missed out on another title due to numerous incidents, including Monteiro's testing accident. In 2018, the series became the World Touring Car Cup and switched to TCR regulations, with JAS giving technical support to the Honda teams. The Civic Type R TCR scored 12 wins across the 2018 and 2019 seasons, with its performances in 2019 helping it to win the TCR Model of the Year award.

In 2014, JAS Motorsport announced that it will build a Honda Civic touring car based on TCR regulations. The car became available to customers in 2015, and subsequently won multiple titles, including the 2017 TCR International Series teams' championship. In 2017, JAS announced that it will produce a new TCR car based on the tenth generation Civic, which would be available to customers in 2018. The tenth generation-based model won the TCR Model of the Year award in 2019 after claiming numerous wins and titles.

JAS Motorsport developed the GT3 racing version of the second-generation NSX sports car in collaboration with Honda, and is also responsible for assembling the cars and providing customer support in Europe, Asia and South America. The NSX GT3 made its racing debut in 2017 and received an Evo upgrade in 2019, followed by an Evo22 update in 2022. The car notably won the 2019 and 2020 championships in the GTD class of the IMSA SportsCar Championship, as well as the 2019 titles in the GT300 class of the Super GT Series, among others. JAS itself raced the car in the Intercontinental GT Challenge in 2019 and 2020, where they achieved pole position and podium results, finished sixth overall at the 2019 Spa 24 Hours, and nearly won the 2020 drivers' title.

Car constructor

Complete World Touring Car Championship results
(key) (Races in bold indicate pole position) (Races in italics indicate fastest lap)

†Did not finish the race, but was classified as he completed over 90% of the race distance.

See also
 Honda in motorsport

References

External links

 
 

Italian auto racing teams
Auto racing teams established in 1995
1995 establishments in Italy
Deutsche Tourenwagen Masters teams
World Touring Car Championship teams
Italian racecar constructors
International GT Open teams
Blancpain Endurance Series teams
Honda in motorsport
British Touring Car Championship teams